Somatochlora albicincta, the ringed emerald, is a species of emerald dragonfly in the family Corduliidae. It is found in North America.

The IUCN conservation status of Somatochlora albicincta is "LC", least concern, with no immediate threat to the species' survival. The population is stable.

Gallery

References

Further reading

External links

 

Corduliidae
Articles created by Qbugbot
Insects described in 1839